The following is a current list of Catholic archdioceses ordered by continent and country (for the Latin Church) and by liturgical rite (for the Eastern Catholic Churches).

Many smaller countries, as well as large countries with small Catholic populations, lack (the need for) ecclesiastical province(s) and hence for large Metropolitan archdioceses and may rather have canonical jurisdictions that are immediately subject to the Holy See – dioceses, ordinariates, apostolic vicariates, apostolic exarchates, territorial prelatures, apostolic administrations, apostolic prefectures and/or missions sui iuris (all of which may also exist in countries with one or more archdioceses).

Current Latin Church Archdioceses

Current Latin in Europe 

 Albania - Shkodër-Pult, Tirana-Durrës
 Austria - Salzburg, Wien
 Belarus - Minsk-Mohilev
 Belgium - Mechelen-Brussels
 Bosnia and Herzegovina - Vrhbosna
 Croatia - Đakovo-Osijek, Rijeka, Split-Makarska, Zadar, Zagreb
 Czech Republic - Olomouc, Prague
 England and Wales - Birmingham, Cardiff, Liverpool, Southwark, Westminster
 France
Metropolitan Archdioceses: Besançon, Bordeaux, Clermont, Dijon, Lille, Lyon, Marseille, Montpellier, Paris, Poitiers, Reims, Rennes, Rouen, Toulouse, Tours
Archdioceses: Aix, Albi, Auch, Avignon, Bourges, Cambrai, Chambéry-Saint-Jean-de-Maurienne-Tarentaise, Sens, Strasbourg
 Germany - Bamberg, Berlin, Freiburg im Breisgau, Hamburg, Köln, München und Freising, Paderborn
 Gibraltar - Directly subject to the Holy See
 Greece - Corfu, Zakynthos and Cefalonia, Naxos, Andros, Tinos and Mykonos, Athens, Rhodes
 Hungary - Eger, Esztergom-Budapest, Kalocsa-Kecskemét, Veszprém
 Ireland (including Northern Ireland) - Armagh, Cashel, Dublin, Tuam
 Italy (including Vatican City and San Marino)
Patriarchate: Patriarchate of Venice
Metropolitan Archdioceses: Agrigento, Ancona-Osimo, Bari-Bitonto, Benevento, Bologna, Cagliari, Campobasso-Boiano, Catania, Catanzaro-Squillace, Chieti-Vasto, Cosenza-Bisignano, Fermo, Firenze, Foggia-Bovino, Genova, Gorizia, L'Aquila, Lecce, Messina-Lipari-Santa Lucia del Mela, Milano, Modena-Nonantola, Napoli, Oristano, Palermo, Perugia-Città della Pieve, Pesaro, Pescara-Penne, Pisa, Potenza-Muro Lucano-Marsico Nuovo, Ravenna-Cervia, Reggio Calabria-Bova, Roma, Salerno-Campagna-Acerno, Sassari, Siena-Colle di Val d'Elsa-Montalcino, Siracusa, Taranto, Turin, Trento, Udine, Vercelli
Archdioceses: Acerenza, Amalfi–Cava de' Tirreni, Brindisi-Ostuni, Camerino-San Severino Marche, Capua, Crotone-Santa Severina, Ferrara-Comacchio, Gaeta, Lanciano-Ortona, Lucca, Manfredonia-Vieste-San Giovanni Rotondo, Matera-Irsina, Monreale, Otranto, Rossano-Cariati, Sant'Angelo dei Lombardi-Conza-Nusco-Bisaccia, Sorrento-Castellammare di Stabia, Spoleto-Norcia, Trani-Barletta-Bisceglie, Urbino-Urbania-Sant'Angelo in Vado
 Latvia - Riga
 Liechtenstein - Vaduz
 Lithuania - Kaunas, Vilnius
 Luxembourg - Luxembourg
 Malta - Malta
 Monaco - Monaco
 Montenegro - Bar
 Netherlands - Utrecht
 Poland - Białystok, Częstochowa, Gdańsk, Gniezno, Katowice, Kraków, Łódź, Lublin, Poznań, Przemyśl, Szczecin-Kamień, Warmia, Warszawa, Wrocław
 Portugal - Patriarchate of Lisbon, Braga, Évora
 Romania - Bucharest, Alba Iulia
 Russian Federation - Mother of God at Moscow
 Scotland - Glasgow, Saint Andrews and Edinburgh
 Serbia - Belgrade
 Slovakia - Bratislava, Trnava, Košice
 Slovenia - Ljubljana, Maribor
 Spain - Barcelona, Burgos, Granada, Madrid, Mérida-Badajoz, Oviedo, Pamplona y Tudela, Santiago de Compostela, Seville, Tarragona, Toledo, Valencia, Valladolid, Zaragoza, West Indies (ext.)
 Ukraine - Lviv

Current Latin in the Americas

Current Latin in Central America and Caribbean 
 Antilles - Castries, Fort-de-France, Kingston, Nassau, Port of Spain
 Costa Rica - San José de Costa Rica
 Cuba - Camagüey, San Cristóbal de la Habana, Santiago de Cuba
 Dominican Republic - Santiago de los Caballeros, Santo Domingo
 El Salvador - San Salvador
 Guatemala - Guatemala, Los Altos Quetzaltenango-Totonicapán
 Haïti - Cap-Haïtien, Port-au-Prince
 Honduras - Tegucigalpa
 Nicaragua - Managua
 Panama - Panamá
 Puerto Rico (U.S.) - San Juan de Puerto Rico

Current Latin in North America 

 Canada
 Metropolitan archdioceses: Edmonton, Gatineau, Grouard-McLennan, Halifax, Keewatin-Le Pas, Kingston, Moncton, Montréal, Ottawa, Québec, Regina, Rimouski, Saint-Boniface, St. John's, Sherbrooke, Toronto (Latin), Vancouver
 Immediately subject to the Holy See: Winnipeg (Latin)
 Mexico - Acapulco, Antequera, Chihuahua, Durango, Guadalajara, Hermosillo, Jalapa, León, México, Monterrey, Morelia, Puebla de los Angeles, San Luis Potosí, Tlalnepantla, Tijuana, Tulancingo, Tuxtla Gutiérrez, Yucatán

 United States of America - Anchorage, Atlanta, Baltimore, Boston, Chicago, Cincinnati, Denver, Detroit, Dubuque, Galveston-Houston, Hartford, Indianapolis, Kansas City in Kansas, Los Angeles, Louisville, Miami, Milwaukee, Mobile, Newark, New Orleans, New York, Oklahoma City, Omaha, Philadelphia, Portland in Oregon, Saint Louis, Saint Paul and Minneapolis, San Antonio, San Francisco, Santa Fe, Seattle, Washington, San Juan de Puerto Rico, United States Military Services

Current Latin in South America 

 Argentina - Bahía Blanca, Buenos Aires, Córdoba, Corrientes, La Plata, Mendoza, Mercedes-Luján, Paraná, Resistencia, Rosario, Salta, San Juan de Cuyo, Santa Fe de la Vera Cruz, Tucumán
 Bolivia -Cochabamba, La Paz, Santa Cruz de la Sierra, Sucre
 Brazil - Aparecida, Aracaju, Belém do Pará, Belo Horizonte, Botucatu, Brasília, Campinas, Campo Grande, Cascavel, Cuiabá, Curitiba, Diamantina, Feira de Santana, Florianópolis, Fortaleza, Goiânia, Juiz de Fora, Londrina, Maceió, Manaus, Mariana, Maringá, Montes Claros, Natal, Niterói, Olinda e Recife, Palmas, Paraíba, Passo Fundo, Pelotas, Porto Alegre, Porto Velho, Pouso Alegre, Ribeirão Preto, Santa Maria, São Luís do Maranhão, São Paulo, São Salvador da Bahia, São Sebastião do Rio de Janeiro, Sorocaba, Teresina, Uberaba, Vitória, Vitória da Conquista
 Chile - Antofagasta, Concepción, La Serena, Puerto Montt, Santiago de Chile
 Colombia - Barranquilla, Bogotá, Bucaramanga, Cali, Cartagena, Ibagué, Manizales, Medellín, Nueva Pamplona, Popayán, Santa Fe de Antioquía, Tunja, Villavicencio
 Ecuador - Cuenca, Guayaquil, Portoviejo, Quito
 Paraguay - Asunción
 Peru - Arequipa, Ayacucho, Cusco, Huancayo, Lima, Piura, Trujillo
 Uruguay - Montevideo
 Venezuela - Barquisimeto, Calabozo, Caracas Santiago de Venezuela, Ciudad Bolívar, Coro, Cumaná, Maracaibo, Mérida, Valencia en Venezuela

Current Latin in Asia 

 Bangladesh - Dhaka, Chittagong
 China, People's Republic of - Anking, Canton, Changsha, Chungking, Foochow, Hangchow, Hankow, Kaifeng, Kunming o Yünnan, Kweyang, Lanchow, Mukden o Fengtien, Nanchang, Nanking, Nanning, Peking, Sian, Suiyüan, Taiyüan, Tsinan
 India - Agra, Bangalore, Bhopal, Bombay, Calcutta, Cuttack-Bhubaneswar, Delhi, Gandhinagar, Goa and Daman, Guwahati, Hyderabad, Imphal, Madras and Mylapore, Madurai, Nagpur, Patna, Pondicherry and Cuddalore, Raipur, Ranchi, Shillong, Trivandrum, Verapoly, Visakhapatnam
 Indonesia - Ende, Jakarta, Kupang, Makassar, Medan, Merauke, Palembang, Pontianak, Samarinda, Semarang
 Iran - Teheran-Isfahan
 Iraq - Baghdad
 Israel - Patriarchate of Jerusalem
 Japan - Nagasaki, Osaka, Tokyo
 Kazakhstan - Maria Santissima in Astana
 Korea (Republic of Korea and Democratic People's Republic of Korea) - Daegu, Gwangju, Seoul
 Macau - Roman Catholic Diocese of Macau
 Malaysia - Kuala Lumpur, Kota Kinabalu, Kuching,
 Myanmar - Mandalay, Taunggyi, Yangon
 Pakistan - Karachi, Lahore
 Philippines - Cáceres, Cagayan de Oro, Capiz, Cebu, Cotabato, Davao, Jaro, Lingayen-Dagupan, Lipa, Manila, Nueva Segovia, Ozamiz, Palo, San Fernando, Tuguegarao, Zamboanga
 Singapore - Singapore
 Sri Lanka - Colombo
 Taiwan - Taipei
 Thailand - Bangkok, Thare and Nonseng
 Turkey - Izmir
 Vietnam - Hanoi, Hue, Ho Chi Minh City

Current Latin in Oceania 

 Australia - Adelaide, Brisbane, Canberra and Goulburn, Hobart, Melbourne, Perth, Sydney
 New Zealand - Wellington
 Pacific - Agaña, Nouméa, Papeete, Samoa-Apia, Suva
 Papua New Guinea - Madang, Mount Hagen, Port Moresby, Rabaul
 Solomon Islands - Honiara

Current Latin in Africa 
 Algeria - Algiers
 Angola - Huambo, Luanda, Lubango, Malanje, Saurímo
 Benin - Cotonou, Parakou
 Burkina Faso - Bobo-Dioulasso, Koupéla, Ouagadougou
 Burundi - Bujumbura, Gitega
 Cameroon - Bamenda, Bertoua, Douala, Garoua, Yaoundé
 Central African Republic - Bangui
 Chad - N'Djaména
 Congo - Brazzaville, Owando, Pointe-Noire
 Democratic Republic of Congo - Bukavu, Kananga, Kinshasa, Kisangani, Lubumbashi, Mbandaka-Bikoro
 Côte d'Ivoire - Abidjan, Bouaké, Gagnoa, Korhogo
 Equatorial Guinea - Malabo
 Gabon - Libreville
 Ghana - Accra, Cape Coast, Kumasi, Tamale
 Guinea - Conakry
 Kenya - Kisumu, Mombasa, Nairobi, Nyeri
 Lesotho - Maseru
 Liberia - Monrovia
 Madagascar - Antananarivo, Antsiranana, Fianarantsoa, Toliara
 Malawi - Blantyre, Lilongwe
 Mali - Bamako
 Morocco - Rabat, Tanger
 Mozambique - Beira, Maputo, Nampula
 Namibia - Windhoek
 Nigeria - Abuja, Benin City, Calabar, Ibadan, Jos, Kaduna, Lagos, Onitsha, Owerri
 Rwanda - Kigali
 Senegal - Dakar
 Sierra Leone - Freetown
 South Africa - Bloemfontein, Cape Town, Durban, Johannesburg, Pretoria
 South Sudan - Juba
 Sudan - Khartoum
 United Republic of Tanzania - Arusha, Dar-es-Salaam, Mwanza, Songea, Tabora
 Togo - Lomé
 Tunisia - Tunis
 Uganda - Gulu, Kampala, Mbarara, Tororo
 Zambia - Kasama, Lusaka
 Zimbabwe - Bulawayo, Harare

Current Eastern Catholic Archeparchies (Archdioceses) 
Several smaller particular churches sui iuris have no single archbishopric.

Current Byzantine

 Melkite Greek Catholic Church
Syria - Damascus (Patriarchal See of Antioch), Aleppo (nominally Metropolitan), Bosra and Hauran (nominally Metropolitan), Homs (nominally Metropolitan), Latakia and the Valley of the Christians
 Egypt, Sudan and South Sudan - as titular Patriarch of Alexandria.
Lebanon - Baalbek, Baniyas and Marjeyoun (suffragan of Tyre), Beirut and Byblos (nominally Metropolitan), Sidon and Deir el-Kamar (suffragan of Tyre), Tripoli (suffragan of Tyre), Tyre, Zahle and Forzol and all the Bekaa
 Israel and the Palestinian territories - Jerusalem of the Melkites (a patriarchal vicariate), Akka
 Jordan - Petra and Philadelphia in Amman and all Transjordan
 Romanian Greek Catholic Church - Archeparchy of Fagaraș and Alba Iulia (Major Archbishopric)
 Ukrainian Greek Catholic Church
Ukraine - Kyiv–Halych (the Major Archdiocese in chief), Ivano-Frankivsk, Lviv, Ternopil–Zboriv
Elsewhere - Przemyśl–Warsaw (Metropolitan of the province in Poland), Winnipeg (Metropolitan of the province in Canada), Philadelphia (Metropolitan of the USA province), São João Batista em Curitiba (Metropolitan of the Brazilian province)
 Hungarian Greek Catholic Church - Archeparchy of Hajdúdorog (Metropolitanate in chief)
 Ruthenian Greek Catholic Church - Archeparchy of Pittsburgh (Metropolitan Archdiocese in chief)
 Slovak Byzantine Catholic Church - Metropolitan Archeparchy of Prešov (in chief)

Current Alexandrian 

 Coptic Catholic Church - Patriarchate of Alexandria (in chief)
 Ethiopic Catholic Church - Metropolitan Archeparchy of Addis Abeba (in chief)
 Eritrean Catholic Church - Metropolitan Archeparchy of Asmara (in chief)

Current Armenian 
Armenian Catholic Church - Patriarchate of Cilicia (also Archeparchy of Beirut), Aleppo of the Armenians (or Halab or Beroea), Baghdad of the Armenians, Istanbul (Constantinople), Lviv of the Armenians

Current West Syriac 

Syriac Maronite Church - Patriarchate of Antioch, Damascus, Aleppo, Antelias, Beirut, Tripoli, Tyre, Haifa and the Holy Land, Cyprus
 Syriac Catholic Church - Patriarchate of Antioch (in chief)
 Syro-Malankara Catholic Church - Major Archeparchy of Trivandrum (the Major Archbishop, in chief), Archeparchy of Tiruvalla

Current East Syriac 
 Chaldean Catholic Church - Patriarchate of Babylon, Baghdad (Metropolitan), Kirkuk (Metropolitan), Tehran (Metropolitan), Urmya (Metropolitan), Ahwaz, Basra, Diyarbakir, Erbil, Mosul
Syro-Malabar Catholic Church - Eranakulam-Angamaly (Major Archdiocese, in chief), Changanassery, Tellicherry, Thrissur, Kottayam

Former and Titular Archdioceses

Latin
Archdiocese of Achrida (Ohrid, North Macedonia)
Archdiocese of Aegina (Aegina, Greece)
Archdiocese of Amasea (Amasya, Turkey)
Archdiocese of Amastris (Amasra, Turkey)
Archdiocese of Amorium (Amorium, Turkey)
Archdiocese of Anasartha (Khanasir, Syria)
Archdiocese of Anchialus (Pomorie, Bulgaria)
Archdiocese of Ancyra (Ankara, Turkey)
Archdiocese of Antinoe (Antinoöpolis, Egypt)
Archdiocese of Antiochia in Pisidia (Antioch of Pisidia, Turkey)
Archdiocese of Apamea in Bithynia (Apamea Myrlea, Turkey)
Archdiocese of Aprus (Apros, Turkey)
Patriarchate of Aquileia (Aquileia, Italy)
Archdiocese of Arcadiopolis in Europa (Lüleburgaz, Turkey)
Archdiocese of Beroea (Aleppo, Syria)
Archdiocese of Beroë (Stara Zagora, Bulgaria)
Archdiocese of Bizya (Vize, Turkey)
Archdiocese of Bosporus (Kerch, Ukraine)
Archdiocese of Bostra (Bosra, Syria)
Archdiocese of Brysis (Pınarhisar, Turkey)
Archdiocese of Caesarea in Palaestina (Caesarea Maritima, Israel)
Archdiocese of Callinicum (Raqqa, Syria)
Archdiocese of Camachus (Kemah, Turkey)
Archdiocese of Carpathus (Karpathos, Greece)
Archdiocese of Carthage (Carthage, Tunisia)
Archdiocese of Chalcedonia (Chalcedon, Turkey)
Archdiocese of Chalcis in Syria (Qinnasrin, Syria)
Archdiocese of Chersonesus in Zechia (Chersonesus, Ukraine)
Archdiocese of Cius (Cius, Turkey)
Archdiocese of Claudiopolis in Honoriade (Bolu, Turkey)
Archdiocese of Colonia in Armenia (Koyulhisar, Turkey)
Archdiocese of Corinthus (Corinth, Greece)
Archdiocese of Cotrada (Cotrada, Turkey)
Archdiocese of Cotyaeum (Kütahya, Turkey)
Archdiocese of Cypsela (İpsala, Turkey)
Archdiocese of Cyrrhus (Cyrrhus, Syria)
Archdiocese of Cyzicus (Cyzicus, Turkey)
Archdiocese of Damascus (Damascus, Syria)
Archdiocese of Darnis (Derna, Libya)
Archdiocese of Dercos (Yeşilköy, Turkey)
Archdiocese of Doclea (Doclea, Montenegro)
Archdiocese of Drizipara (Drizipara, Turkey)
Archdiocese of Ephesus (Ephesus, Turkey)
Archdiocese of Euchaitae (Euchaita, Turkey)
Archdiocese of Gabala (Jableh, Syria)
Archdiocese of Gangra (Çankırı, Turkey)
Archdiocese of Garella (Garella, Turkey)
Archdiocese of Germa in Hellesponto (Germa in Hellesponto, Turkey)
Archdiocese of Germia (Germia, Turkey)
Archdiocese of Hadrianopolis in Haemimonto (Edirne, Turkey)
Archdiocese of Heliopolis in Phoenicia (Baalbek, Lebanon)
Archdiocese of Hemesa (Homs, Syria)
Archdiocese of Heraclea in Europa (Marmara Ereğlisi, Turkey)
Archdiocese of Hierapolis in Phrygia (Hierapolis, Turkey)
Archdiocese of Iconium (Konya, Turkey)
Archdiocese of Justiniana Prima (Justiniana Prima, Serbia)
Archdiocese of Larissa in Thessalia (Larissa, Greece)
Archdiocese of Lauriacum (Enns, Austria)
Archdiocese of Lemnus (Lemnos, Greece)
Archdiocese of Leontopolis in Augustamnica (Leontopolis, Egypt)
Archdiocese of Leontopolis in Pamphylia (Ulupınar, Turkey)
Archdiocese of Leucas (Lefkada, Greece)
Archdiocese of Luxemburgum (Luxembourg City, Luxemburg)
Archdiocese of Maronea (Maroneia, Greece)
Archdiocese of Martyropolis (Silvan, Turkey)
Archdiocese of Maximianopolis in Rhodope (Mosynopolis, Greece)
Archdiocese of Melitene (Malatya, Turkey)
Archdiocese of Methymna (Mithymna, Greece)
Archdiocese of Miletus (Miletus, Turkey)
Archdiocese of Misthia (Misthia, Turkey)
Archdiocese of Mitylene (Mytilene, Greece)
Archdiocese of Mocissus (Kırşehir, Turkey)
Archdiocese of Mopsuestia (Mopsuestia, Turkey)
Archdiocese of Myra (Myra, Turkey)
Archdiocese of Nacolia (Nakoleia, Turkey)
Archdiocese of Neapolis in Pisidia (Neapolis, Turkey)
Archdiocese of Neocaesarea in Ponto (Niksar, Turkey)
Archdiocese of Nicaea (Nicaea, Turkey)
Archdiocese of Nicaea Parva (Havsa, Turkey)
Archdiocese of Nicomedia (Nicomedia, Turkey)
Archdiocese of Nicopolis ad Nestum (Nicopolis ad Nestum, Bulgaria)
Archdiocese of Nicopolis in Epiro (Nicopolis, Greece)
Archdiocese of Nicopsis (Nicopsis)
Archdiocese of Nicosia (Nicosia, Cyprus)
Archdiocese of Nubia (Nubia)
Archdiocese of Odessus (Varna, Bulgaria)
Archdiocese of Oxyrhynchus (Oxyrhynchus, Egypt)
Archdiocese of Paltus (Paltus, Syria)
Archdiocese of Parium (Parium, Turkey)
Archdiocese of Pedachtoë (Pedachtoë, Turkey)
Archdiocese of Pelusium of the Romans (Pelusium, Egypt)
Archdiocese of Perge (Perga, Turkey)
Archdiocese of Pessinus (Pessinus, Turkey)
Archdiocese of Petra in Palaestina (Petra, Jordan)
Archdiocese of Philippi (Philippi, Greece)
Archdiocese of Philippopolis in Thracia (Plovdiv, Bulgaria)
Archdiocese of Pompeiopolis in Cilicia (Soli, Cilicia, Turkey)
Archdiocese of Pompeiopolis in Paphlagonia (Pompeiopolis, Turkey)
Archdiocese of Preslavus (Pliska, Bulgaria)
Archdiocese of Ptolemais in Thebaide (Ptolemais Hermiou, Egypt)
Archdiocese of Ratiaria (Ratiaria, Bulgaria)
Archdiocese of Rhizaeum (Rize, Turkey)
Archdiocese of Rhoina (Sultanhanı, Turkey)
Archdiocese of Rhusium (Keşan, Turkey)
Archdiocese of Salamis (Salamis, Cyprus)
Archdiocese of Samosata (Samosata, Turkey)
Archdiocese of Sardes (Sardis, Turkey)
Archdiocese of Scythopolis (Beit She'an, Israel)
Archdiocese of Sebastea (Sivas, Turkey)
Archdiocese of Sebastopolis in Abasgia (Sukhumi, Georgia)
Archdiocese of Seleucia in Isauria (Silifke, Turkey)
Archdiocese of Selge (Selge, Turkey)
Archdiocese of Selymbria (Silivri, Turkey)
Archdiocese of Serrae (Serres, Greece)
Archdiocese of Side (Side, Turkey)
Archdiocese of Silyum (Silyum, Turkey)
Archdiocese of Soteropolis (Soteropolis)
Archdiocese of Stauropolis (Aphrodisias, Turkey)
Archdiocese of Sugdaea (Sudak, Ukraine)
Archdiocese of Synnada in Phrygia (Synnada in Phrygia, Turkey)
Archdiocese of Tarsus (Tarsus, Turkey)
Archdiocese of Ternobus (Veliko Tarnovo, Bulgaria)
Archdiocese of Thebae (Thebes, Greece)
Archdiocese of Thessalonica (Thessaloniki, Greece)
Archdiocese of Tiburnia (Teurnia, Austria)
Archdiocese of Tomi (Constanța, Romania)
Archdiocese of Traianopolis in Rhodope (Traianoupoli, Greece)
Archdiocese of Trapezus (Trabzon, Turkey)
Archdiocese of Tyana (Tyana, Turkey)
Archdiocese of Tyrus (Tyre, Lebanon)
Archdiocese of Velebusdus (Kyustendil, Bulgaria)
 (Verissa, Turkey)
Archdiocese of Viminacium (Viminacium, Serbia)

See also 

 List of Catholic dioceses (alphabetical)
 List of Catholic dioceses (structured view)
 List of Catholic titular sees (defunct but nominally restored)
 List of Catholic military ordinariates
 List of Catholic apostolic administrations
 List of Catholic apostolic vicariates
 List of Eastern Catholic exarchates
 List of Catholic apostolic prefectures
 List of Catholic territorial prelatures
 List of Catholic missions sui juris
 Diplomatic missions of the Holy See
 Patriarch

Non-Catholic
 List of Anglican dioceses and archdioceses
 List of Lutheran dioceses and archdioceses
 List of Orthodox dioceses and archdioceses

Notes 
 The Antilles is nunciature to Antigua and Barbuda, Barbados, Bahamas, Belize, Dominica, Grenada, Guyana, Jamaica, Saint Kitts and Nevis, Saint Lucia, Suriname, Trinidad and Tobago, and Saint Vincent and the Grenadines
 The Pacific is nunciature to Cook Islands, Fiji, Micronesia, Kiribati, Marshall Islands, Nauru, Palau, Tonga, Vanuatu, and Samoa

External links 
 
 

Archdioceses